The 2019 National Premier Soccer League season is part of the 107th season of FIFA-sanctioned soccer in the United States and the 17th season of the National Premier Soccer League (NPSL). Miami FC, formerly "Miami FC 2," are the defending champion.

Changes from 2018
Six members of the NPSL will participate in the inaugural NPSL Members Cup tournament immediately following the 2019 regular season.

Teams

Incoming teams

Moved and/or rebranded teams

Outgoing teams

Standings and results

Midwest Region

North Conference

Great Lakes Conference

East Conference

Northeast Region

North Atlantic Conference

Mid-Atlantic Conference

Keystone Conference

South Region

Sunshine Conference

Southeast Conference

Lone Star Conference

Heartland Conference

West Region

Southwest Conference

Northwest Conference

Golden Gate Conference

Playoffs

Northeast Region Conference playoffs

Keystone Conference playoffs

Bold = winner
* = after extra time, = penalty shootout score

Mid-Atlantic Conference playoffs

Bold = winner
* = after extra time, = penalty shootout score

North Atlantic Conference playoffs

Bold = winner
* = after extra time, = penalty shootout score

South Region Conference playoffs

Southeast Conference playoffs

Bold = winner
* = after extra time, = penalty shootout score

Sunshine Conference playoffs

Bold = winner
* = after extra time, = penalty shootout score

Lone Star Conference playoffs

Bold = winner
* = after extra time, = penalty shootout score

Heartland Conference playoffs

Bold = winner
* = after extra time, = penalty shootout score

Regional and National playoffs

Bold = winner* = after extra time, = penalty shootout score

Members Cup 
Six teams participated in the NPSL Members Cup, formerly known as the NPSL Founders Cup, a competition that ran from August to October 2019 after the conclusion of the  regular 2019 NPSL season. It was intended to lead to a new professional league beginning play in the spring of 2020.

Several other clubs were initially announced to be part of the tournament. California United Strikers FC officially announced on Twitter that it had withdrawn from both the Founders Cup and subsequent league on March 1, 2019 and were replaced by Napa Valley 1839 FC on March 7, 2019. On June 27, 2019, Oakland Roots SC announced its intent to join the upcoming National Independent Soccer Association (NISA) in Fall 2019, where they joined Cal United. They would therefore be dropping out of the tournament "to focus on NISA as (their) preferred path forward."

When the competition officially re-branded on July 24, 2019, ASC San Diego, Cal FC, FC Arizona, Miami FC, and Miami United FC had been removed, Miami FC joining NISA, while the Michigan Stars FC had been added. On August 15, Chattanooga and Detroit City were both announced to be joining NISA in the spring of 2020. Michigan Stars were also confirmed to be joining NISA on September 21. And New York Cosmos ended up later joining, in 2020.

Teams

Standings

Fixtures and results

References 

 
National Premier Soccer League seasons

NPSL